Andrej Martin and Hans Podlipnik were the defending champions but chose to participate with different partners. Martin chose to participate with Tomasz Bednarek, while Podlipnik chose to partner with Lukáš Dlouhý. Martin and Podlipnik faced each other in the semifinals, with Podlipnik advancing to the final. Podlipnik failed to defend his title, losing to Sander Arends and Tristan-Samuel Weissborn 7–6(10–8), 6–7(4–7), [10–5] in the final.

Seeds

Draw

References
 Main Draw

Prosperita Open - Doubles